The Peugeot 208 T16 is an R5 rally car developed by Peugeot Sport. It is based upon the Peugeot 208 road car and is the successor of the successful Peugeot 207 S2000.

ERC Victories
{|class="wikitable" style="font-size: 95%; "
! No.
! Event
! Season
! Driver
! Co-driver
|-
|align="right" style="padding-right: 0.5em;"| 1
|  Acropolis Rally
|align="center"| 2014
|  Craig Breen
|  Scott Martin
|-
|align="right" style="padding-right: 0.5em;"| 2
|  Rally Liepāja–Ventspils
|align="center"| 2015
|  Craig Breen
|  Scott Martin
|-
|align="right" style="padding-right: 0.5em;"| 3
| / Circuit of Ireland
|align="center"| 2015
|  Craig Breen
|  Scott Martin
|-
|align="right" style="padding-right: 0.5em;"| 4
|  Rallye Açores
|align="center"| 2015
|  Craig Breen
|  Scott Martin
|-
|}

See also
 Ford Fiesta R5
 Citroën DS3 R5
 Škoda Fabia R5
 Power-to-weight ratio

External links
 Rally results of Peugeot 208 T16

R5 cars
208 T16
All-wheel-drive vehicles